Robert Knox (1791–1862) was a Scottish surgeon, anatomist and zoologist.

Robert Knox or Rob Knox may also refer to:

Robert Knox (bishop) (1808–1893), Bishop of Down, Connor and Dromore and Archbishop of Armagh
Robert Knox (sailor) (1641–1720), English sea captain in the service of the British East India Company
Robert Knox (private equity investor) (born 1952)
Robert Knox (fl. 1966), mayor of Berwick-upon-Tweed
Robert C. Knox (1892–1947), justice of the Arkansas Supreme Court
Robert Sinclair Knox (1881–c. 1963), British Army officer
Rob Knox (1989–2008), English actor
Rob Knox (producer) (born 1980), American record producer and songwriter